Pool Shark 2 is a sports video game developed by Blade Interactive and published by Zoo Digital Publishing for the PlayStation 2, Xbox and Microsoft Windows. It is the sequel to Pool Shark.

Reception

The PlayStation 2 version received "generally favourable reviews", while the PC and Xbox versions received "mixed or average reviews", according to the review aggregation website Metacritic.

References

External links
 

2004 video games
Cue sports video games
Europe-exclusive video games
Multiplayer and single-player video games
PlayStation 2 games
Video games developed in the United Kingdom
Xbox games
Windows games